Pseudaxine is a genus which belongs to the phylum Platyhelminthes and class Monogenea; all its species are parasites of fish.

Morphology

Species of Pseudaxine are ectoparasites that affect their host by attaching themselves as larvae on the gills of the fish and grow into adult stage. This larval stage is called oncomiracidium, and is characterized as free swimming and ciliated. The clamps are distributed along one margin of the haptor. Pseudaxine resemble Axine in having a single row of 20 – 30 clamps on one side of the body. However, it differs from Axine in having their hooks situated at the posterior end of the clamp row. Pseudaxine also resembles Gastrocotyle in having a single row of clamps on one side, however, in Pseudaxine the haptor is oblique, while in Gastrocotyle the haptor is parallel to the body-axis, and extends to the ovarian zone.

Systematics
Pseudaxine was established to accommodate Pseudaxine trachuri from the gills of the Atlantic horse mackerel Trachurus trachurus (referred to as Caranx trachurus in the original description), designated as the type species of the genus. It was placed in the Microcotylinae, in Gastrocotylinae  then in Arreptocotylidae. Currently, it is included in the Gastrocotylidae.

Species
Nine species have been described in Pseudaxine:

References

Gastrocotylidae
Monogenea genera
Parasites of fish